The 2018 NCAA Division II baseball tournament decided the champion of baseball in NCAA Division II for the 2018 season. The  claimed their first national title. The Cougars made their eighth appearance in the College World Series, having won the event in 2002 and two other times finished as runner up.

Regionals

Atlantic Regional–Millersville, Pennsylvania
Hosted by Millersville at Bennett J. Cooper Park.

Central Regional–Magnolia, Arkansas
Hosted by Southern Arkansas at Goodheart Field at Walker Stadium.

East Regional–New Haven, Connecticut
Hosted by New Haven at Frank Vieira Field.

Midwest Regional–Springfield, Illinois
Hosted by UIS at UIS Baseball Field.

South Regional–Lakeland, Florida
Hosted by Florida Southern at Henley Field.

Southeast Regional–Tigerville, South Carolina
Hosted by North Greenville at Ashmore Field.

South Central Regional–Canyon, Texas
Hosted by West Texas A&M at Wilder Park.

West Region–Azusa, California
Hosted by Azusa Pacific at Cougar Baseball Field.

College World Series

Participants

Results

Bracket
All Games Played at USA Baseball National Training Complex in Cary, North Carolina

Game results

References

 
NCAA Division II Baseball Tournament
NCAA Division II baseball tournament